Janise Yntema (born March 29, 1962) is an American painter working in the ancient wax encaustic technique.  Yntema was born in New Jersey and attended Parsons School of Design and the Art Students League of New York. She has had solo exhibitions in New York and throughout the United States as well as London, Amsterdam and Brussels. Her works are in the collections of several museums in Europe and the United States, including the Museum of Modern Art and Metropolitan Museum of Art.

She works and lives in Brussels, Belgium.

Early life and education
Janise Yntema was born in 1962 in New Jersey. She attended St John the Divine Stoneyard Institute. Yntema studied at the Art Students League of New York in 1979. From 1980 to 1984, she studied at Parsons School of Design, where she received her Bachelor of Fine Arts. In 2020 she received a Master of Arts from the Paris School of History and Culture, University of Kent with a dissertation titled "ECOACTIVISM: Framing the Geopolitics of  Contemporary Landscape and its Representation".

Career
Her paintings are created from numerous layers of translucent applications of pigmented wax that are fused together with a blowtorch to create a smooth and glossy skin-like surface.  Yntema has worked in marble dust, aluminum, iron powder, wood and wax. She said in 1996 that her body of work "makes reference towards figuration and landscape, but is abstracted and abbreviated to encompass the initial intensity of the physical gesture."

In 1991, Yntema edited Portrait of a Mile Square City: Stories from Hoboken, written by David Plakke. 
Yntema lives and works in Brussels, Belgium.

Exhibitions
Yntema has participated in more than 60 group exhibitions and had solo exhibits in New York, London, Amsterdam and Brussels. Some of her notable exhibitions are:
 1993 - Solo exhibition, A.I.R. Gallery, New York City, NY
 1994 - Williams Center for the Arts, Rutherford, New Jersey
 1994 - The Definitive Decade - Aljira, a Center for Contemporary Art, Newark, NJ
 1995 - New Jersey Arts Annual 1995 Fine Arts - Morris Museum, Morristown, NJ
 1995 - City Without Walls 20th Anniversary Exhibition - City Without Walls (cWOW Gallery), Newark, NJ
 1995 - Paintings and Constructions, solo exhibition - A.I.R. Gallery, New York City, NY
 1996 - Slide presentation of her work, Westfield Community Room, Westfield, New Jersey.
 1997 - Recent Work, solo exhibition - A.I.R. Gallery, New York City, NY
 1997 - Mixed Media, Simon Gallery, New York
 1998 - Mixed Media, Simon Gallery, New York
 2010 - Fahrenheit 180: A Group Encaustic Exhibition, Ann Street Gallery, Newburgh, NY
 2011 - Winter solo exhibition - Galerie Josine Bokhoven, Amsterdam
 2012 - Beth Namenwirth & Janise Yntema - Galerie Josine Bokhoven, Amsterdam
 2014 - Gothic Light- Libre Choix Cabinet Artistique, Bruxelles
 2015 - The Temperature of Light, Kean University, Nancy Dryfoos Gallery, Union, New Jersey
 2016 - Le Paysage Tranquille, Galerie Marie Demange, Brussels, Belgium
 2017 - Depth Perception, Cape Cod Museum of Art, Dennis, MA
 2018 - Truc Troc, BOZAR Centre for Fine Arts, Brussels, Belgium
2019 - "Praeter Terram" The Green Door Gallery, Bruxelles 
2019   "Sense of Place: Landscape and Identity" Cadogan Contemporary, London, UK 
2020    "Realist and Lyrical Landscape" The Scottish Gallery, Edinburgh

Collections
Yntema's work is included in the permanent collections of the following institutions:

 Amherst College, Amherst, MA
 Art Institute of Chicago, Chicago, IL
 Brooklyn Museum of Art, Library Collections, Brooklyn, NY
 Carnegie Institute Museum of Art, Pittsburgh, PA
 Cincinnati Museum of Art, Cincinnati, OH
 Fred Jones Jr. Museum of Art, Norman, OK
 Gutenberg Museum, Mainz, Germany
 Metropolitan Museum of Art, New York NY
 Milwaukee Arts Museum, Milwaukee, WI
 Museum of Modern Art, Library Collections, New York, NY
 National Museum for Women in the Arts, Washington, D.C.
 Provincetown Art Association and Museum, Provincetown, MA
 Stedelijk Museum, Amsterdam, The Netherlands
 Yale University Art Gallery, New Haven, CT

References

Further reading
 
 
 
 
 
 
 
 Cap Sur 2016, Guy Gilsoul, Juliette et Victor Magazine, December/January 2015/2016 no.52, page 55
 Le Peintre et les Abeilles Guy Gilsoul, January 17, 2016,  Le Vif Express, Belgique

External links
 Janise Yntema's official website

American women painters
1962 births
Living people
Parsons School of Design alumni
Artists from New Jersey
20th-century American painters
20th-century American women artists
21st-century American painters
21st-century American women artists
Art Students League of New York alumni
American expatriates in Belgium